The United Nations Educational, Scientific and Cultural Organization (UNESCO) designates World Heritage Sites of outstanding universal value to cultural or natural heritage which  have been nominated by countries which are signatories to the UNESCO World Heritage Convention, established in 1972. Cultural heritage consists of monuments (such as architectural works, monumental sculptures, or inscriptions), groups of buildings, and sites (including archaeological sites). Natural features (consisting of physical and biological formations), geological and physiographical formations (including habitats of threatened species of animals and plants), and natural sites which are important from the point of view of science, conservation or natural beauty are defined as natural heritage. Bulgaria accepted the convention on 7 March 1974. 

, there are ten World Heritage Sites listed in Bulgaria. The first four sites were listed in 1979: the Boyana Church, the Madara Rider, the Rock-hewn Churches of Ivanovo, and the Thracian Tomb of Kazanlak. Four more sites were listed in 1983, one in 1985, and the most recent one in 2017. Seven of these sites are cultural and three are natural. There is one transnational site, the Ancient and Primeval Beech Forests of the Carpathians and Other Regions of Europe, which is shared with 17 other countries. In addition, Bulgaria maintains 16 sites on the tentative list.  



World Heritage Sites 
UNESCO lists sites under ten criteria; each entry must meet at least one of the criteria. Criteria i through vi are cultural, and vii through x are natural.

Tentative list 
In addition to sites inscribed on the World Heritage list, member states can maintain a list of tentative sites that they may consider for nomination. Nominations for the World Heritage list are only accepted if the site was previously listed on the tentative list. , Bulgaria recorded 16 sites on its tentative list.

References 

List
Bulgarian culture
Bulgaria
World Heritage Sites